HaKohen (Hebrew: "The priest") is a Jewish given name and surname. Notable people with the name include:

Nathan HaKohen Adler (1741–1800), German kabbalist
Meir Simcha HaKohen of Dvinsk (1843–1926), rabbi and prominent leader of Orthodox Judaism in Eastern Europe
Shneur Chaim HaKohen Gutnick (1921–2003), Orthodox Jewish Chabad rabbi in Australia
Aaron ben Jacob ben David Hakohen Provençal rabbi, living at Narbonne, France who suffered the expulsion of the Jews in 1306
Abraham ben Shabbetai Hakohen (1670–1729), Jewish physician, rabbi, religious philosopher and poet on Zante
Akhiyahu HaKohen (fl. 910 CE), rabbi and Hebrew-language grammarian in Tiberias
Alexandri HaKohen (died 1349), prominent 14th century rabbinic authority born in Erfurt, Germany
David Hakohen, late thirteenth-century Hebrew liturgical poet from Avignon
Isaac Hakohen (1013–1103), Moroccan Talmudist and posek
Ishmael ben Elisha Hakohen, leader of the first generation of the Tannaim
Joseph Hakohen (1496–1575), historian and physician of the 16th century
Malachi ben Jacob HaKohen (1695–1772), renowned Talmudist, methodologist, Kaballists
Matityahu ben Yochanan HaKohen (died 165 BC), Jewish priest with a role in the Jewish revolt against the Syrian Greeks
Shabbatai HaKohen (1621–1662), 17th Century talmudist and halakhist
Shlomo HaKohen (Vilna) (1828–1905), the famed Av Beis Din and Posek of Vilna
Yeshivas Rabbeinu Yisrael Meir HaKohen, is a major Orthodox yeshiva in the United States based in Kew Gardens Hills, Queens, New York
Yisroel Meir HaKohen (1839–1933), influential rabbi of the Musar movement, a Halakhist, posek, and ethicist
Yonatan Hakohen (1135–1210), leading French tosafist
Zadok HaKohen of Lublin, a significant Jewish thinker and Hasidic leader
Abraham HaKohen Kalisker (1741–1810), prominent Chassidic Rabbi of the 3rd generation of Chassidic leaders
Chanokh Heynekh HaKohen Levin (1798–1870), of Aleksander, served as the rebbe of a community of thousands of Hasidim
Shlomo HaKohen of Lissa (18th century), rabbi and biblical commentator
Yehuda HaKohen ben Meir, German rabbi and Talmudic scholar of the late tenth and early eleventh century CE from Mainz
Isaac HaKohen Rapoport, 18th-century rabbi who lived in Palestine; born and died at Jerusalem, a pupil of rabbi Hezekiah da Silva
Zvi Yosef HaKohen Resnick (1841–1912), orthodox Russian rabbi and Rosh yeshivah
Mnachem Hakohen Risikoff (1866–1960), orthodox rabbi in Russia and the United States, prolific author of scholarly works
Mordechai HaKohen of Safed (1523–1598), scholar and kabbalist who flourished in the second half of the sixteenth century in Safed
Aaron HaKohen ibn Sargado, tenth-century AD gaon (Jewish religious leader) in Pumbedita, Babylonia
Sholom HaKohen Schwadron (1912–1997), Haredi rabbi and orator
Meir HaKohen Shiff (1608–1644), German rabbi and Talmud scholar

Jewish surnames